The Mine Hill School District is a community public school district that serves students in pre-kindergarten through sixth grade from Mine Hill Township, in Morris County, New Jersey, United States.

As of the 2018–19 school year, the district, comprising one school, had an enrollment of 347 students and 34.0 classroom teachers (on an FTE basis), for a student–teacher ratio of 10.2:1.

The district participates in the Interdistrict Public School Choice Program, having been approved on November 2, 1999, as one of the first ten districts statewide to participate in the program. Seats in the program for non-resident students are specified by the district and are allocated by lottery, with tuition paid for participating students by the New Jersey Department of Education.

The district is classified by the New Jersey Department of Education as being in District Factor Group "FG", the fourth-highest of eight groupings. District Factor Groups organize districts statewide to allow comparison by common socioeconomic characteristics of the local districts. From lowest socioeconomic status to highest, the categories are A, B, CD, DE, FG, GH, I and J.

For seventh through twelfth grades, public school students attend the schools of the Dover School District in Dover as part of a sending/receiving relationship. The district also serves students from Victory Gardens, which has been fully consolidated into the Dover School District since 2010. The high school was recognized with the National Blue Ribbon School Award in 2013. Schools in the Dover School District attended by Mine Hill students (with 2018–19 enrollment from the National Center for Education Statistics) are 
Dover Middle School with 511 students in grade 7-8 and
Dover High School with 983 stundets in grades 9-12.

Awards and recognition
During the 1991–92 school year, Canfield Avenue School was recognized with the National Blue Ribbon Award from the United States Department of Education, the highest honor that an American school can achieve.

School
Canfield Avenue School had an enrollment of 344 students during the 2018–19 school year.
Adam Zygmunt, Principal

Administration
Core members of the district's administration are:
Lee S. Nittel, Superintendent
Carolina Rodriguez, Business Administrator / Board Secretary

Board of education
The district's board of education, with seven members, sets policy and oversees the fiscal and educational operation of the district through its administration. As a Type II school district, the board's trustees are elected directly by voters to serve three-year terms of office on a staggered basis, with either two three seats up for election each year held (since 2012) as part of the November general election.

References

External links
Mine Hill School District
 
School Data for the Mine Hill School District, National Center for Education Statistics

Mine Hill Township, New Jersey
New Jersey District Factor Group FG
School districts in Morris County, New Jersey
Public elementary schools in New Jersey